KBST-FM (95.7 FM, "K-Best 95.7") is a radio station licensed to serve Big Spring, Texas.  The station is owned by Kbest Media, LLC. It airs a country music format.  KBST FM is considered the best and most prolific radio station in Howard County.  The morning show, is simulcast on KBST AM, Suddenlink Cable Channel 2, Antenna Receiver Channel 99, Stanton Cable Channel 10, and kbst.com.

The station was assigned the KBST-FM call letters by the Federal Communications Commission on March 17, 1989.

The station began in 1961 as independently owned KFNE (K-Fine) on 95.3 MHz. The studios and transmitter were in a downtown building. Longtime Texas broadcaster John B. Walton, Jr. had a one-third ownership interest in the 1960s until the station was sold to crosstown 1270 KHEM (AM) (now deleted). The transmitter was moved to the nearby hill above Big Spring.

References

External links
 

BST-FM
Country radio stations in the United States
Radio stations established in 1961
1961 establishments in Texas